Dewis is a surname. Notable people with the surname include:

 George Dewis (1913–1994), English footballer
 Karen Dewis (born 1962), Canadian tennis player
 Louis Dewis (1872–1946), Belgian painter
 Norman Dewis (1920–2019), English racing driver

See also
 Dewi (disambiguation)
 Dewisland, hundred in Wales
 Dews
 Mewis